was the third son of Tokugawa Iemitsu.  His mother was Iemitsu's concubine Onatsu no Kata. His childhood name was Chomatsu (長松). When Iemitsu died in 1651, he was only 8 years old.  After he was given Kofu Domain, he remained there until his death in 1678.

Family
 Father: Tokugawa Iemitsu
 Mother: Onatsu no Kata (1622-1683) later Junshōin
 Adopted Mother: Senhime
 Wife: Ryusoin (1648-1669) Daughter of Nijo Mitsuhira
 Concubines: 
 Kogyoku-in (d.1673)
 Ohara no Kata (1637-1664) later Choshoin
 Sons
 Tokugawa Tsunatoyo by Choshoin
 Matsudaira Kiyotake (1663-1724) by Choshoin

Ancestry

References

1644 births
1678 deaths
Tokugawa clan